Abaeté Futebol Clube, commonly known as Abaeté, is a Brazilian football club based in Abaetetuba, Pará state. They competed in the Série C once.

History
The club was founded on March 5, 1936. They won the Campeonato Paraense Second Level in 2004. Abaeté competed in the Série C in 2005, when they were eliminated in the Third Stage by fellow Pará state club Remo.

Achievements
 Campeonato Paraense Second Level:
 Winners (1): 2004

Stadium
Abaeté Futebol Clube play their home games at Estádio Humberto Parente. The stadium has a maximum capacity of 3,100 people.

References

Association football clubs established in 1936
Football clubs in Pará
1936 establishments in Brazil
Abaetetuba